The Steve Howe Trio is an English jazz trio led by Yes guitarist  Steve Howe. Howe formed the band in 2007 with his son Dylan Howe on drums and Ross Stanley on Hammond organ.

History
The Steve Howe Trio toured the United Kingdom in 2007. The set list included songs by jazz guitarist Kenny Burrell, whom Howe has credited as an inspiration. In June 2008, the trio toured again and released the album The Haunted Melody.

Further touring followed in March 2010, along with the release of a live album, Travelling. The album contains material recorded from shows in 2008 in the UK and Canada.

Discography 
 The Haunted Melody (2008)
 Travelling (2010)
 New Frontier (2019), includes three compositions by Bill Bruford

References

External links
 New Frontier : https://www.cherryred.co.uk/product/the-steve-howe-trio-new-frontier-cd/

English jazz ensembles